The Journal of Asian American Studies is a triannual academic journal established in 1998 and is the official publication of the Association for Asian American Studies. The journal publishes scholarly articles exploring theoretical developments, research interests, policy and pedagogical issues. It also includes reviews of books and other media that relate to the Asian American experience. The journal is published by the Johns Hopkins University Press and the editor-in-chief is Huping Ling (Truman State University).

External links
 
Journal of Asian American Studies at Project Muse

Publications established in 1998
Triannual journals
Cultural journals
English-language journals
Johns Hopkins University Press academic journals
Asian-American mass media